El Abayarde Contra-Ataca is the third studio album by Tego Calderón. It was released on August 28, 2007. The tracks in the album are a fusion of African and Caribbean rhythms, including salsa, merengue, Colombian and Venezuelan sounds. Tego's first single is "Tradicional A Lo Bravo", produced by Almonte and is proposed from his MySpace page. This album received a nomination for a Grammy Award for Best Latin Urban Album.

Release and promotion
Tego Calderón released three singles for El Abayarde Contra-Ataca, and they were all major singles. All three singles have music videos, though the "Quitarte To'" single didn't have as much airplay as the others. All three singles are available for digital download on iTunes, Amazon, Rhapsody, and other major retailer stores. Tego Calderón performed "Tradicional A Lo Bravo" live on Mi TRL, and got interviewed for the album.

Background
As Tego Calderón stated, he wasn't too happy about making music on his previous album, The Underdog/El Subestimado, but when he made El Abayarde Contra-Ataca, Tego was really happy about making music. To reflect that, the lyrical style of the album is mostly influenced by African sounds, and other things Tego likes. The musical style of the album also had African sounds, including the third single, "Ni Fu Ni Fa" Produced by Gabriel "Gabo" Lugo.

Track listing
 Alegría
 Tradicional a Lo Bravo
 Ni Fu Ni Fa
 ¿Cuál Es El Plan y Eso? (featuring Residente Calle 13 & Yaviah)
 Los Míos (featuring Pirulo)
 Tú Pa' Mí
 Quitarte To' (featuring Randy)
 Lo Hecho Hecho Esta (featuring Chyno Nyno, Ñejo, Pirulo & Voltio)
 T-T-T Tego (Remix)
 El Que No Lucha No Avanza
 Quiéreme Como Soy (featuring Pirulo)
 No Era Por Ahí (featuring DJ Ricky)
 Por Mi Madre
 Envidia (featuring Aventura)

See also
List of number-one Billboard Latin Rhythm Albums of 2007

Tego Calderón albums
2007 albums